Mikhail Gorchakov (Russian: Михаил Горчаков) may refer to
Mikhail Alkseyevich Gorchakov (1768–1831), Russian general
Mikhail Alexandrovich Gorchakov (1839–1897), Russian diplomat
Mikhail Dmitrievich Gorchakov (1793–1861), Russian general